Ronan Le Crom (born 13 July 1974) is a French former professional football goalkeeper.

Career
Le Crom began his career at AJ Auxerre, joining the senior squad in 1991. He played only three matches for the club, one in each of his final three seasons, before leaving in 2002. In his time at Auxerre, he had spent single-season loans at LB Châteauroux and ASOA Valence in Ligue 2.

Since then, he spent his career in Ligue 1, beginning with Guingamp where he played two full seasons before their relegation. The third season of his Guingamp contract was spent on loan at Saint-Étienne, although he did not play a match. Still contracted to Guingamp, Le Crom moved to Troyes on a single-season loan in 2005–06. After playing 38 league matches in the season he signed permanently in the summer of 2006.

In January 2012 Le Crom joined Paris Saint-Germain having been a free agent since leaving AS Nancy-Lorraine in July 2011. He made his debut as a substitute on 26 May 2013 in an away 3–1 win at Lorient, coming on to replace Alphonse Areola, who was also making his debut. Le Crom's debut lasted just 21 minutes as he was sent off for a foul on Lamine Gassama and he was seen crying on the touchline and needed to be consoled by team mates afterwards. Arnaud Le Lan converted the resulting penalty past makeshift goalkeeper Mamadou Sakho. This would prove to be Le Crom's last game of professional football as he retired at the end of the season.

Honours
Paris Saint-Germain
Ligue 1: 2012–13

References

External links
 
 

1974 births
Living people
Sportspeople from Morbihan
French footballers
Association football goalkeepers
Ligue 1 players
Ligue 2 players
AJ Auxerre players
LB Châteauroux players
ASOA Valence players
En Avant Guingamp players
AS Saint-Étienne players
ES Troyes AC players
RC Lens players
Grenoble Foot 38 players
AS Nancy Lorraine players
Paris Saint-Germain F.C. players
Footballers from Brittany